Wills Township is one of the nineteen townships of Guernsey County, Ohio, United States. As of the 2010 census the population was 1,613, of whom 1,207 lived in the unincorporated portion.

Geography
Located in the eastern part of the county, it borders the following townships:
Madison Township – north
Oxford Township – northeast
Millwood Township – southeast
Richland Township – southwest
Center Township – west
Jefferson Township – northwest

Two villages are located in Wills Township: part of Lore City in the southwestern corner, and Old Washington in the west.

Name and history
Wills Township was organized in 1810. It is the only Wills Township statewide.

Government
The township is governed by a three-member board of trustees, who are elected in November of odd-numbered years to a four-year term beginning on the following January 1. Two are elected in the year after the presidential election and one is elected in the year before it. There is also an elected township fiscal officer, who serves a four-year term beginning on April 1 of the year after the election, which is held in November of the year before the presidential election. Vacancies in the fiscal officership or on the board of trustees are filled by the remaining trustees.

References

External links
County website

Townships in Guernsey County, Ohio
Townships in Ohio